The Beijing BJ2022 is a 1/2 or 3/4 ton 4×4 utility vehicle developed by Beijing Automobile Works and used by the PLA. The BJ2022 has been in production since 2005.

It's also referred as "Yongshi" or Brave Warrior. It was jointly developed by Beijing Auto Works and Chrysler.

History
The vehicle entered PLA service in August 2007.

Design and development

Initial bid for a successor vehicle to the BJ2020S were made in 1999. A concept vehicle was revealed in 2002. A couple of prototypes were made specially for the Chinese army. After finalizing the design, production of the BJ2022 began in 2005. Deliveries to the Chinese Army began in 2007. In 2009 due to financial troubles in the US the Chrysler left the joint venture and granted Beijing Auto Works the rights to continue production of this vehicle under its own name. Currently the BJ2022 is being produced in large numbers. It is the most widely used 4x4 vehicle in the Chinese army. It is also used by some paramilitary and law enforcement units.

The BJ2022 is based on a Jeep Cherokee, but is longer and wider. The new vehicle is larger and more spacious than the older BJ2020. It is used as a troop and cargo transport, command vehicle or reconnaissance vehicle.

A baseline BJ2022 has a fully enclosed 4-door body. This vehicle has a  payload capacity. It carries five soldiers, including the driver. Windscreen can be folded over the bonnet and top and side windows removed in order to reduce vehicle height.

Other body types are also available. There are 4-door vehicles with open top, 2-door vehicles with hard top, 2-door pickup, and possibly some other. Some of them can carry up to 8 men, including the driver. These vehicles have  or  capacity, depending on the version. Payload capacity corresponds with the towed load. A lightly armored version has also been developed.

This vehicle is powered by a 3.0-liter turbocharged diesel engine, sourced from Nissan. It developed 140 hp. Civil versions are also available with a 2.7-liter petrol engine, also sourced by Nissan. Vehicle is fitted with a front-mounted self-recovery winch. It's also equipped with either GPS or GLONASS.

Operators

  
 : People's Liberation Army.
 :The government of the Dominican Republic received 8 BJ2022 vehicles and 140 motorcycles as a donation from the People's Republic of China.
 : Philippine Army received 49 BAW BJ2022 in the long wheelbase, pickup truck version.
 : BJ2022s reported to be spotted with Syrian troops.

Gallery

See also 
 BJ212/BJ2020

References 

BAW vehicles
Military vehicles of the People's Republic of China
Military light utility vehicles
Military vehicles introduced in the 2000s
Sport utility vehicles
Mid-size sport utility vehicles